Eritrea–Sudan relations have historically been tense but have normalized in recent years.

By the end of 1993, shortly after Eritrea's independence from Ethiopia, Eritrea charged Sudan with supporting the activities of Eritrean Islamic Jihad, which carried out attacks against the Eritrean government. Eritrea broke relations with Sudan at the end of 1994, became a strong supporter of the Sudan People's Liberation Movement/Sudan People's Liberation Army (SPLA), and permitted the opposition National Democratic Alliance to locate its headquarters in the former Sudan embassy in Asmara. At the urging of the United States, Ethiopia and Eritrea joined Uganda in the so-called Front Line States strategy, which was designed to put military pressure on the Sudanese government.

Eritrea's surprise May 1998 invasion of the Ethiopian-administered border village of Badme dramatically changed the political situation in the region. Operating on the axiom that the “enemy of my enemy is my friend,” Ethiopia normalized relations with Sudan by the end of 1998, and Eritrea reestablished ties with Sudan in 2000. Although Sudan and Eritrea continued to maintain diplomatic relations, real improvement in ties was short lived. Sudan closed its border with Eritrea in 2002, and the Sudanese foreign minister charged in February 2003 that Eritrea had amassed forces along the border with Sudan. The Sudanese government also accused Eritrea of supporting rebel groups in Darfur. The undemarcated border with Sudan also posed a problem for Eritrean external relations.

Eritrea resumed diplomatic relations with Sudan on December 10, 2005. The presidents of Sudan and Eritrea met for the first time in five years in mid-2006 in Khartoum. Eritrea played a prominent role in brokering a peace agreement between the Sudanese government and Sudan's Eastern Front. This put Sudan–Eritrea relations on a new, positive track, although Sudan remained worried about Eritrea's activities in Darfur. The nations’ leaders met again in Khartoum near the end of 2006 and frequently in subsequent years. In 2007 President Isaias Afwerki also met with Salva Kiir in Juba. Isaias described relations with Sudan as resting on solid ground and having “bright prospects.” Eritrea seemed to have ended its contacts with Darfur rebel groups and become supportive of the NPC in Sudan. It also established a consulate-general in South Sudan's capital of Juba, and its consul-general in May 2010 expressed support for the principle of self-determination. The same month, Yemane Ghebremeskel, a senior adviser to Isaias, commented that Eritrea hoped the January 2011 referendum would lead to the unity of Sudan.

The Eritrean President, Isaias Afewerki, and his Sudanese counterpart Omar Al-Bashir held talks in Asmara on a number of bilateral issues of mutual concern to the two East African countries. The talks dealt with enhancing bilateral ties and cooperation including making their shared border more open. Sudan and Eritrea agreed to abolish entry visa requirements, opening their common borders for free movement of both nationals. In 2011, Eritrea and Sudan cooperated in the building of the  Kassala-Al Lafa Highway linking the two countries.

References

 
Sudan
Bilateral relations of Sudan